Ernest William Buckmaster (1897–1968) was an Australian artist born in Victoria. He won the Archibald Prize in 1932 with a portrait of Sir William Irvine. He also served as an Australian war artist during World War II.

Life and career
Buckmaster was born in the Melbourne suburb of Hawthorn on 3 July 1897. He was the eldest son of Harry Amos Buckmaster, straw-hat manufacturer, and his wife Letitia Martha née' Chandler. He attended a state primary school at Box Hill where he showed drawing skills at an early age.

Buckmaster was apprenticed to a signwriter in 1913. His poor physique made him unsuitable for service in World War I. His employer, an amateur painter, suggested he undertake art training.

Buckmaster studied at the National Gallery School in Melbourne from 1918 to 1924. There his teachers included Lindsay Bernard Hall and W.B. McInnes. He emerged as an accomplished painter of traditional portraits, still lifes and landscapes with a substantial work-rate and output.  Large commissioned oil paintings work took longer. His Archibald prize winning portrait took fourteen sittings with the subject before it was finished.

His first solo exhibition took place at the Athenaeum Gallery in Melbourne in February 1926. His financial position was such that he had to ask the framer to prepare them for hanging on credit. The paintings sold well, with one bought by the director of the National Gallery of Victoria for its collection.

His work is popular in Australia and New Zealand where public art galleries and private collectors hold examples of his paintings. Buckmaster disliked modern art, criticising it in his book and in letters to newspapers. A member of the Victorian Artists Society, he sold nineteen paintings exhibited with them between 1919 and 1924. He continued to be associated with the V.A.S. as a councillor (1929–30) and exhibitor (till 1943). In 1930 he left Australia on a year long study tour to Europe. He visited Europe again in 1938.

His portrait of the lieutenant-governor of Victoria, Sir William Irvine, won the Archibald prize for 1932. The following year he held solo exhibits in Melbourne, Sydney and Adelaide. He was a foundation member of the Australian Academy of Art. In 1936 he was commissioned to paint a portrait of Sir James Mitchell, the lieutenant-governor of Western Australia and his portrait of Miss Jessica Harcourt, known as "Australia's loveliest girl" was a finalist in the 1936 Archibald Prize.

Buckmaster was a Second World War official war artist for the Australian military's Military History Section. This took him to Singapore to paint the Japanese surrender. These paintings are held by the Australian War Memorial, Canberra.

He married Dorothy Laura Cook on 12 February 1936. They divorced on 15 February 1939 and a week later he married Florence Botting in Melbourne.

Buckmaster made two extended trips to New Zealand in the 1940s and 1950s at the invitation of Henry Kelliher, Managing Director of Dominion Breweries in Auckland, who had seen Buckmaster's 1944 exhibition at the David Jones Gallery, Sydney. On the latter visit he wrote that he had driven 6,000 miles throughout the country to paint landscapes.

He died on 18 October 1968 at his home at Warrandyte. He was survived by his wife and their five children. His grave is in the Lilydale cemetery.

Buckmaster's self-portrait, which was a finalist in the 1936 Archibald Prize, is in the Art Gallery of New South Wales.

Some of Buckmaster's work is on extended loan from his family to The Hotel Windsor in Melbourne.

As well as the Archibald prize he received the National Gallery of Victoria Award (1941) and twice won the Albury Art Prize (1950 and 1963).

Although an accomplished painter of portraits and still life subjects, he is best known for his landscapes. Those he generally painted En plein air rather than from photographs.

One of his paintings sold for Aus$27,025 in 2003. The average price of 1,185 of his paintings recently sold at auction prior to May 2021 was AUS$5,147

See also
Australian art

External links
Archibald Prize winners
Self Portrait of Ernest Buckmaster, finalist in 1936 Archibald Prize
Ernest Buckmaster interviewed by Hazel de Berg, 1965 (sound recording in 2 parts) available online
Ernest Buckmaster (1951), The art of Ernest Buckmaster, Melbourne, Lothian
Barry Ellam & Norman Buckmaster (1993), Art by Ernest Buckmaster, Box Hill, Melbourne, Evelyn Fine Arts.

References

1897 births
1968 deaths
Archibald Prize winners
Australian people of World War II
Australian portrait painters
World War II artists
Australian war artists
20th-century Australian painters
20th-century Australian male artists
Australian landscape painters
Australian still life painters
Australian male painters
People from Hawthorn, Victoria
Artists from Melbourne
National Gallery of Victoria Art School alumni